Doto curere is a species of sea slug, a nudibranch, a marine gastropod mollusc in the family Dotidae.

Distribution
This species was described from the Caribbean coast of Costa Rica.

Description
This nudibranch is translucent grey in colour. The cerata have rather pointed tubercles without terminal spots.

EcologyDoto curere'' was found on rocky reefs with an abundance of hydroids. The specific food for this species is unknown.

References

Dotidae
Gastropods described in 2001